John Lafayette Rader (born February 11, 1927) is an American Democratic politician, who served as the first Attorney General of Alaska. He was a member of the Alaska House of Representatives from 1959 to 1960 and 1963-1966 and the Senate from 1969 to 1979. He was the Senate president from 1977 to 1979.

He was a candidate for the United States House of Representatives in 1968, losing the Democratic primary to Nick Begich. Begich would go on to lose to incumbent Howard Wallace Pollock.

References

1927 births
Living people
Alaska Attorneys General
Democratic Party members of the Alaska House of Representatives
Democratic Party Alaska state senators
Presidents of the Alaska Senate
People from Anchorage, Alaska
People from Elk County, Kansas
University of Kansas School of Law alumni